Philip Wong Yu-hong, GBS (23 December 1938 – 6 June 2021) was a politician in Hong Kong who served as a member of the legislative council (Functional constituencies, Commercial [Second]), a deputy to the National People's Congress and vice-chairman of the Chinese General Chamber of Commerce in Hong Kong. He was also a recipient of the Gold Bauhinia Star award.

Criticism

Academic credentials
On the Legislative council website, Wong was listed to have an M.Sc. degree from the University of California, Berkeley, a Ph.D. degree in engineering from the California Coast University, and a J.D. degree from Southland University.

Share market analyst and Hong Kong activist, David Webb, requested an investigation be launched to check for his possible improper academic credentials. Nothing has come from Webb's request.

The University of California credentials passed muster as well as California Coast University's. California Coast University's bulletin states that it "does not require formal, on-campus residence or classroom attendance" because it is an online-only school accredited by the DEAC. Wong did receive the engineering degree from California Coast University on 27 August 1984, nearly 21 years before the CCU was accredited by the DEAC in January, 2005 (and the PhD programs were dropped as a condition of the school's accreditation); however, California Coast University had full state approval of all academic programs from the State of California which made the degrees legal and academically legitimate nearly everywhere in the world. Southland University is no longer in existence.

Middle finger incident
During the July 2003 Article 23 march, Wong was filmed to be giving demonstrators the middle finger gesture.  Hong Kong Canadian politician Albert Cheng asked in a meeting in October 2004 whether his middle finger gesture has been referred to a committee for consideration. Jasper Tsang, a colleague of Wong, replied that Wong had already apologised the previous day.

Death
On 6 June 2021, Wong died at the age of 82 after a six-month battle with brain cancer in a hospital in the United States.  A memorial was held at AL Moore-Grimshaw Mortuaries Bethany Chapel in Phoenix, Arizona.

References

External links
 Legco Philip Wong biodata

1938 births
2021 deaths
Hong Kong businesspeople
Delegates to the 9th National People's Congress from Hong Kong
Delegates to the 10th National People's Congress from Hong Kong
Politicians from Quanzhou
University of California, Berkeley alumni
California Coast University alumni
Recipients of the Gold Bauhinia Star
Businesspeople from Fujian
People's Republic of China politicians from Fujian
New Hong Kong Alliance politicians
Members of the Provisional Legislative Council
Hong Kong Christians
HK LegCo Members 1991–1995
HK LegCo Members 1995–1997
HK LegCo Members 1998–2000
HK LegCo Members 2000–2004
HK LegCo Members 2004–2008
HK LegCo Members 2008–2012
Members of the Preparatory Committee for the Hong Kong Special Administrative Region
American people of Chinese descent
Members of the Selection Committee of Hong Kong
Hong Kong Basic Law Consultative Committee members
Hong Kong Affairs Advisors
Deaths from brain cancer in the United States